A flocculent spiral galaxy is a type of spiral galaxy. Unlike the well-defined spiral architecture of a grand design spiral galaxy, flocculent (meaning "flaky") galaxies are patchy, with discontinuous spiral arms. Self-propagating star formation is the apparent explanation for the structure of flocculent spirals. Approximately 30% of spirals are flocculent, 10% are grand design, and the rest are referred to as "multi-armed". The multiple-arm type is sometimes grouped into the flocculent category.

The prototypical flocculent spiral is NGC 2841.

List of flocculent spiral galaxies

References

Sources
 PDF A Near-Infrared Atlas of Spiral Galaxies, Debra Meloy Elmegreen, 1981,

External links

 COSMOS astronomy encyclopedia - Flocculent Spiral

 
Galaxy morphological types